Etinosa Idemudia is a Nigerian actress, social media influencer and filmmaker. She is best known for her role as Akugbe in the ROK  original series, Blood of Enogie, for which she won the award for Best Actress in a TV Series, at the Hollywood and African Prestigious Awards. She is also known for her online comedy skits which she began producing and sharing on her instagram channel featuring various Nollywood actors including Daniel K Daniel; as well as for her break-out role as Amanda in the sitcom Chairman and her first feature film production The Washerman.

Early life
Etinosa was born in Warri, Delta State, to Sylvester Idemudia, a retired group general manager of Greenfield Refineries (NNPC Group) and Patricia Idemudia, a reverend and founder of Victory Group of Schools. Etinosa began her primary education at Victory International School, Warri and had her secondary education at Cambridge International School, Warri and Igbinedion Education Centre, Benin, Edo State.

In 2011, she obtained a bachelor's degree in Computer Engineering from Covenant University After her graduation from University, Etinosa began working as a Planning Engineer with Delattre Bezons Nigeria, a subsidiary of Entrepose Contracting.
She formerly worked as a planning Engineer for oil and gas construction projects until 2016 when she went into acting full-time. Etinosa  then went to Royal Arts Academy owned by famous filmmaker Emem Isong where she obtained a Diploma in Performing Arts in 2016.

Within a short time, she featured in several movies and TV productions including; Made for More, The Miracle Centre, Wrongfully hers, Devil in Agbada, Blindspot, Stacy, The Call and The Millions.

Career
In 2013, upon discovering Instagram Videos, Etinosa began producing comedy skits, which she shared on the social media platform. The skits enjoyed rave reviews, bringing her relative success in the Nigerian entertainment industry, which culminated in her winning the award for Best Online Comic Act at the 2016 Scream Awards.

In 2016, Etinosa enrolled at the Royal Arts Academy, Lagos, Nigeria, where she obtained a Diploma in Performing Arts, after which she quit her engineering job to pursue a full-time career in entertainment.

Her first movie role was minor cameo appearance in  A Little White Lie produced by Emem-Isong. Since then, she has gone on to feature in number of notable Nollywood movies and television series including Devil in Agbada, Blood of Enogie, The Call, Chairman, Corpershun and Love in the Wrong Places. In 2017, she won the award for Best Actress at the 48 Hours Film Project for her performance in the short film Scheme

In 2018, she began producing her first feature film, The Washerman, which features several notable Nigerian entertainers and Nollywood actors including Sound Sultan, Ik Ogbonna, Mofe Duncan, Chris Okagbue, Jaywon, Sani Danja, Bryan Okwara, Frank Donga, Judith Audu, Sexy Steel, Stephen Damian, Mercy Isoyip and Etinosa herself. The release of the trailer for the movie built up massive anticipation for the release of the movie scheduled for the Summer of 2018.

In 2021, she won the award for the best Actress in a TV series (Africa) at the Hollywood and African Prestigious Awards in California, United States.

Content creation
As a content provider, Etinosa has provided content for leading Nigerian telecommunications company MTN on their MTN Comedy Plus platform, she also serves as a brand ambassador for MUVng, a vehicle for hire company based in Benin, Edo State, Nigeria.

In April 2020, during the COVID-19 Pandemic lockdown in Nigeria, Etinosa began hosting a weekly online talent competition on her social media platforms for aspiring actors.

Personal life
In December 2020, Etinosa welcomed her first child with her partner. In September 2021, Etinosa lost her father after he had battled an undisclosed illness. She penned an emotional eulogy to him on her social media platforms, describing his death as the worst pain she had ever experienced. In 2022, she criticized Leo DaSilva for always giving relationship advice.

Awards and recognition

Filmography

See also
 List of Nigerian actors
 List of Nigerian film producers

References 

Living people
Social media influencers
Year of birth missing (living people)
Covenant University alumni
Nigerian filmmakers
Nigerian film actresses
Nigerian comedians
Actresses from Edo State
Nigerian film award winners